City Centre Bahrain  is a shopping mall located in the Seef District of Manama, in the Kingdom of Bahrain. It is owned and run by Majid Al Futtaim Properties, which owns several shopping malls across the Middle East.

History
The shopping centre opened in September 2008 to be the largest in Bahrain. It claims 340 retail outlets, including the first Carrefour Hypermarket in Bahrain acting as the mall's anchor store, and 60 dining outlets.

The mall is designed to accommodate weekend visitors from Saudi Arabia across the King Fahd Causeway by featuring two Kempinski hotels and an indoor water park.

Entertainment

Entertainment facilities include:
 Magic Planet is a family entertainment centre for kids and family.
 Wahoo! Waterpark is a 15,000 square metre climate-controlled indoor/outdoor water park. (Closed since 2022)
 A 20-screen Cineco Cinema is spread across 8,000 square metres.

Incidents
 A fire broke out in a restaurant chimney on 8 January 2020 and was extinguished within 55 minutes. The mall was evacuated as a precaution and there were no reported casualties.

References

External links
 City Centre Bahrain official website

2008 establishments in Bahrain
Shopping malls established in 2008
Shopping malls in Manama